The Mid Atlantic Star Party (MASP) was an annual regional gathering of amateur astronomers (star party) held each fall around October near Robbins, North Carolina.

History
The first annual regional gathering of amateur astronomers was held in 1995, MASP is located in one of the darkest spots along the eastern U.S. coast and is the largest annual gathering of amateur astronomers between Vermont's Stellafane and Florida's Winter Star Party.

The party went on hiatus in 2020.

Modern times
With attendance usually numbering in the hundreds, MASP was held at the Occoneechee Council Boy Scout camp for the first decade of operation before scheduling conflicts forced a site change.  The star party has become a focus of the town of Robbins' economic and cultural planning process and has spurred the creation of a regional "dark park" to control light pollution.

See also
 List of astronomical societies

References

External links
 Mid Atlantic Star Party

Amateur astronomy organizations
Astronomy organizations
Star parties
North Carolina culture
Science events in the United States
Annual events in North Carolina
Recurring events established in 1995
1995 establishments in North Carolina